Õllesummer was a beer festival, which took place in Tallinn, Estonia. This festival was the biggest beer festival in Nordic countries. The last festival took place in 2018.

The first festival took place in 1994. Since 1996, the festival location was Tallinn Song Festival Grounds.

During the festival, beer tents and several arenas were set up. Main arena was to be called arena "Postimees" and there were performed Estonian musicians.

Every year, about 80,000 people visited the festival.

Beer summer 2014 took place from 9 to 12 until July at the Tallinn Song Square. During four days, over a hundred Estonian and foreign artists performed on seven stages.

References

Events in Tallinn
Beer festivals
Beer in Estonia
Recurring events established in 1994
Recurring events disestablished in 2018